Prabhanshu Sekhar Pal   (15 July 1913 – 2 June 2007) nick named Jambu, was an Indian revolutionary and member of the Bengal Volunteers who carried out assassinations against British colonial officials in an attempt to secure Indian independence.

Family 
Prabhanshu Sekhar Pal was born in 1913. His father's name is Asutosh Pal and mother's name is Lakhmimani Pal.His father was a doctor and research scholar. Actually his father has his ancestral home at Khanjapur, Daspur, Midnapore. When he was a child he was send to his maternal uncle's house at Midnapore town where he joined the Bengal Volunteers, a revolutionary organisation of British India. He was a close associate of Netaji Subhas Chandra Bose

Revolutionary activities 
After the murder of Magistrate Paddy, Robert Douglas, a ruthless District Magistrate, was posted in Midnapore district.The revolutionaries of the Bengal Volunteers decided to assassinate Douglas because he was responsible for killing two unarmed activists in Hijli Detention Camp. On 30 April 1932, Prabhanshu Sekhar Pal and Pradyot Kumar Bhattacharya fired on the magistrate while he was presiding over a meeting of the Zilla District Board now Zilla Parishad Bhavan. Pal escaped but Bhattacharya was caught on the spot with the revolver. Pradyot did not give away any names of accomplices in spite of severe torture by the police. After the murder of Magistrate Paddy and Robert Douglas no British officer was ready to take the charge of Midnapore District until Mr. Bernard E J Burge, another ruthless District Magistrate, was posted in Midnapore district. The members of the Bengal Volunteers decided to assassinate him also. Pal helped the members of B.V. to collect the weapons for the assassination of Burge, who was killed on 2 September 1933 during the half time of a football match in the police parade ground by Anathbandhu Panja and Mrigendra Dutta.

Later life 
After Pal was released from prison he obtained a B.Com. degree in the year 1941. For the rest of his life he worked as a homeopathic doctor. He was honoured with a tamra patra by the Indian Government in15th August 1972. He died on 2 June 2007.

References

1913 births
2007 deaths
Revolutionary movement for Indian independence
Indian nationalism
Indian people convicted of murder
Indian revolutionaries
People from Paschim Medinipur district
Bengali politicians
Revolutionaries from West Bengal
Indian independence activists from West Bengal